The scaleless black dragonfish (Melanostomias bartonbeani) also known as the scaleless dragonfish is a species of ray-finned fish from the family Stomiidae. It's native to the Eastern, Western and Northwest Atlantic, as well as the Indian and Pacific oceans. The species is mesopelagic.

References 

Stomiidae